Don Brkovich (born June 24, 1959) is a member of the 1979 Michigan Spartan championship college basketball team that won the title when they played Indiana State (33-0) led by Larry Bird.

His older brother Mike, known as the "Canadian Golden Arm", was a starter on that fabled team. The Brkovich brothers are the only known NCAA Canadian brothers to win this coveted title.
Don later transferred to New Mexico and finished his career playing for the Lobos and Gary Colson.

References

1959 births
Living people
Place of birth missing (living people)
Canadian men's basketball players
Canadian people of Serbian descent
Michigan State Spartans men's basketball players
New Mexico Lobos men's basketball players